James Pangsang Kongkal Sangma (born 1976 in Tura, West Garo Hills) is an Indian politician from the state of Meghalaya. Sangma is a current Cabinet Minister of Home, District Council Affairs, Food Civil Supplies & Consumer Affairs, Law, Power, in Government of Meghalaya.
He was first elected to the State Assembly along with his brother Conrad Sangma, both as NCP members in the 2008 state elections where he represents the Dadenggre (Vidhan Sabha constituency)  (ST) constituency in the West Garo Hills district.

Sangma is the son of former Chief Minister of Meghalaya and also Speaker of the Lok Sabha, P. A. Sangma, his sister, Agatha Sangma was a member of the 15th Lok Sabha and a former Union Cabinet minister Minister of State, while his brother  Conrad Sangma from 2009 to 2013 he held the post of Leader of Opposition in the Meghalaya Legislative Assembly and was Member of Parliament from Tura Parliamentary constituency which he won in a by-election after his father's death.

He is married to Riprey Sangma from Gasuapara

References 

1976 births
Living people
People from Tura, Meghalaya
National People's Party (India) politicians
Nationalist Congress Party politicians from Meghalaya
Leaders of the Opposition in Meghalaya
State cabinet ministers of Meghalaya
Meghalaya MLAs 2018–2023
Garo people
Meghalaya MLAs 2008–2013
Meghalaya MLAs 2013–2018